Come Dance with Me is a 1950 British musical film directed by Mario Zampi and starring Max Wall, Gordon Humphris and Yvonne Marsh. The film was made by Zampi's Anglofilm and largely consisted of cabaret acts.

Cast
 Max Wall - Manager 
 Gordon Humphris - Joe Smith - The Boy 
 Yvonne Marsh - The Girl 
 Barbara Hamilton - Kiki - Stage Girl 
 Vincent Ball - Secretary 
 Anton Karas - Himself 
 Anne Shelton - Herself 
 Derek Roy - Himself 
 Stanley Black and his orchestra

References

Bibliography
 Harper, Sue & Porter, Vincent. British Cinema of the 1950s: The Decline of Deference. Oxford University Press, 2007.

External links

1950 films
1950 musical films
Films directed by Mario Zampi
British musical films
British black-and-white films
1950s English-language films
1950s British films